Denosumab (trade names Prolia and Xgeva) is a human monoclonal antibody for the treatment of osteoporosis, treatment-induced bone loss, metastases to bone, and giant cell tumor of bone.

Denosumab is contraindicated in people with low blood calcium levels. The most common side effects are joint and muscle pain in the arms or legs.

Denosumab is a inhibitor of RANKL (receptor activator of nuclear factor kappa-Β ligand), which works by decreasing the development of osteoclasts, which are cells that break down bone. It was developed by the biotechnology company Amgen.

Medical uses
Denosumab is used for those with osteoporosis at high risk for fractures, bone loss due to certain medications, and in those with bone metastases.

Cancer
A 2012 meta-analysis found that denosumab was better than placebo, zoledronic acid and pamidronate, in reducing the risk of fractures in those with cancer.

Osteoporosis
In those with postmenopausal osteoporosis denosumab decreases the risk of fractures but increases the risk of infection. A 2013 review concluded that it is a reasonable treatment for postmenopausal osteoporosis. A 2017 review did not find benefit in males.

Adverse effects
The most common side effects are joint and muscle pain in the arms or legs. There is an increased risk of infections such as cellulitis, hypocalcemia (low blood calcium), hypersensitivity allergy reactions, osteonecrosis of the jaw, and atypical femur fractures.  Another trial showed significantly increased rates of eczema and hospitalization due to infections of the skin. It has been proposed that the increase in infections under denosumab treatment might be connected to the role of RANKL in the immune system. RANKL is expressed by T helper cells, and is thought to be involved in dendritic cell maturation.

Discontinuation of denosumab is associated with a rebound increase in bone turnover. In rare cases this has led to severe hypercalcemia, especially in children. Vertebral compression fractures have also occurred in some people after discontinuing treatment.

Contraindications and interactions
It is contraindicated in people with hypocalcemia; sufficient calcium and vitamin D levels must be reached before starting on denosumab therapy. Data regarding interactions with other drugs are missing. It is unlikely that denosumab exhibits any clinically relevant interactions.

Denosumab works by lowering the hormonal message that leads to excessive osteoclast-driven bone removal and is active in the body for only six months. Similarly to bisphosphonates, denosumab appears to be implicated in increasing the risk of osteonecrosis of the jaw (ONJ) following extraction of teeth or oral surgical procedures but, unlike bisphosphonate, the risk declines to zero approximately 6 months after injection. Invasive dental procedures should be avoided during this time.

Mechanism of action
Bone remodeling is the process by which the body continuously removes old bone tissue and replaces it with new bone. It is driven by various types of cells, most notably osteoblasts (which secrete new bone) and osteoclasts (which break down bone); osteocytes are also present in bone.

Precursors to osteoclasts, called pre-osteoclasts, express surface receptors called RANK (receptor activator of nuclear factor-kappa B). RANK is a member of the tumor necrosis factor receptor (TNFR) superfamily. RANK is activated by RANKL (the RANK-Ligand), which exists as cell surface molecules on osteoblasts. Activation of RANK by RANKL promotes the maturation of pre-osteoclasts into osteoclasts. Denosumab inhibits this maturation of osteoclasts by binding to and inhibiting RANKL. Denosumab mimics the natural action of osteoprotegerin, an endogenous RANKL inhibitor, that presents with decreasing concentrations (and perhaps decreased effectiveness) in patients with osteoporosis. This protects bone from degradation, and helps to counter the progression of the disease.

Regulatory approval

United States
On 13 August 2009, a meeting was held between Amgen and the Advisory Committee for Reproductive Health Drugs (ACRHD) of the U.S. Food and Drug Administration (FDA) to review the potential uses of denosumab.

In October 2009, the FDA delayed approval of denosumab, stating that they needed more information.

On 2 June 2010, denosumab was approved by the FDA for use in postmenopausal women with risk of osteoporosis under the trade name Prolia, and in November 2010 as Xgeva for the prevention of skeleton-related events in patients with bone metastases from solid tumors. Denosumab is the first RANKL inhibitor to be approved by the FDA.

On 13 June 2013, the FDA approved denosumab for treatment of adults and skeletally mature adolescents with giant cell tumor of bone that is unresectable or where resection would result in significant morbidity.

Europe
On 17 December 2009, the Committee for Medicinal Products for Human Use (CHMP) issued a positive opinion for denosumab for the treatment of postmenopausal osteoporosis in women and for the treatment of bone loss in men with hormone ablation therapy for prostate cancer. Denosumab was approved for marketing by the European Commission on 28 May 2010.

References

Further reading

External links
 
 </ref>

Amgen
Monoclonal antibodies
Osteoporosis drugs